Multi-screen may refer to:

 Multi-screen video, video content that is transformed into multiple formats
 Multi-screen cinema, or multiplex (movie theater)
 Multi Screen Media, now Sony Pictures Networks India, an Indian media company

See also
 Split screen (disambiguation)
 Dual Screen (disambiguation)
 Multi-monitor, multiple physical display devices
 Multitouch, technology that enables a surface to recognize more than one point of contact 
 Multi-image, using 35mm slides